The Journal of Family Nursing is a quarterly peer-reviewed medical journal covering the field of family nursing. The editor-in-chief is Janice M. Bell (University of Calgary) and is  published by SAGE Publications. It was established in 1995.

Abstracting and indexing
The journal is abstracted and indexed in Scopus and the Science Citation Index Expanded. According to the Journal Citation Reports, the journal has a 2017 impact factor of 1.955.

References

External links

SAGE Publishing academic journals
English-language journals
General nursing journals
Quarterly journals
Publications established in 1995